Lakefield is a city in Jackson County, Minnesota, United States. The population was 1,694 at the 2010 census.

History
Lakefield was laid out in 1879, when the railroad was extended to that point. It was named for its location near Heron Lake. A post office has been in operation at Lakefield since 1880. The city was incorporated in 1887.

Geography

Minnesota State Highway 86 is the main route through the city. Exit 64 of Interstate 90 is about two miles south.

Demographics

2010 census
As of the census of 2010, there were 1,694 people, 762 households, and 462 families living in the city. The racial makeup of the city was 98.0% White, 0.8% African American, 0.1% Asian, 0.7% from other races, and 0.4% from two or more races. Hispanic or Latino of any race were 2.2% of the population.

There were 762 households, of which 27.4% had children under the age of 18 living with them, 46.5% were married couples living together, 10.2% had a female householder with no husband present, 3.9% had a male householder with no wife present, and 39.4% were non-families. 35.8% of all households were made up of individuals, and 19.9% had someone living alone who was 65 years of age or older. The average household size was 2.18 and the average family size was 2.80.

The median age in the city was 41.4 years. 22.4% of residents were under the age of 18; 7.6% were between the ages of 18 and 24; 23.7% were from 25 to 44; 24.3% were from 45 to 64; and 22.1% were 65 years of age or older. The gender makeup of the city was 46.4% male and 53.6% female.

2000 census
As of the census of 2000, there were 1,721 people, 731 households, and 453 families living in the city. The racial makeup of the city was 99.07% White, 0.23% Native American, 0.17% Asian, 0.41% from other races, and 0.12% from two or more races. Hispanic or Latino of any race were 0.93% of the population.

There were 731 households, out of which 28.0% had children under the age of 18 living with them, 53.4% were married couples living together, 6.4% had a female householder with no husband present, and 37.9% were non-families. 34.1% of all households were made up of individuals, and 20.8% had someone living alone who was 65 years of age or older.  The average household size was 2.24 and the average family size was 2.88.

In the city, the population was spread out, with 23.0% under the age of 18, 6.0% from 18 to 24, 23.8% from 25 to 44, 21.4% from 45 to 64, and 25.8% who were 65 years of age or older.  The median age was 43 years. For every 100 females, there were 88.5 males.  For every 100 females age 18 and over, there were 81.5 males.

The median income for a household in the city was $31,250, and the median income for a family was $37,898. Males had a median income of $26,875 versus $19,932 for females. The per capita income for the city was $16,003.

Politics
Lakefield is located in Minnesota's 1st congressional district, represented by Republican Jim Hagedorn.  At the state level, Lakefield is located in Senate District 22, represented by Republican Bill Weber (politician), and in House District 22B, represented by Republican Rod Hamilton.

References

External links
 City of Lakefield

Cities in Minnesota
Cities in Jackson County, Minnesota